Fonseranes Locks are a flight of staircase locks on the Canal du Midi near Béziers.

The "nine locks" name dates from this time.

However, in 1858 an aqueduct was built to replace the crossing of the Orb. Boats now enter and leave the lower end of the flight through the side of chamber seven, which is permanently kept at its upper water level.  The flight is therefore effectively made up of six locks.  The lower gates of the seventh chamber are now permanently closed; the eighth chamber and the ninth lock, the pre-1858 route descending to the Orb, are disused.

This side exit from chamber seven causes some confusion in describing the flight of locks.  While most sources now ignore the disused eighth chamber, some still describe the flight as a seven-rise, despite chamber seven being permanently at the lower canal level.

In 1983 the Fonseranes inclined plane was built adjacent to the locks, to allow commercial traffic and boats too large for the locks to bypass them.  Unfortunately the project encountered technical problems, and after many years of attempting to solve them the inclined plane was abandoned in 2001.

Traditional buildings such as the stables and the lock keeper's house still remain. These and the locks themselves have made the site the third most popular tourist destination in Languedoc-Roussillon, after the Pont du Gard and the town of Carcassonne.

Though Pierre-Paul Riquet rightly receives much credit and acknowledgement for the creation of the Canal du Midi, we may forget that many individual parts of the canal were built by subcontractors other than Riquet.  The subcontractors for these locks were two illiterate brothers, Michel and Pierre Medailhes.  Many of the workers were women.

See also
Locks on the Canal du Midi

References

External links 
 The French article from which this article was translated
 Fonserannes Locks
 Plan of the Fonserannes Locks

Buildings and structures in Hérault
Locks on the Canal du Midi
Transport in Occitania (administrative region)
Tourist attractions in Hérault
Staircase locks